Cristiana Reali (born March 16, 1965) is an Italian-Brazilian actress. She has appeared in numerous theatre pieces, television series and a few movies.

Biography
Reali was born in São Paulo, Brazil, the daughter of the Brazilian journalist Elpídio Reali Júnior. Cristina emigrated to France along with her family at a young age. She graduated from the Lycée Moliėre in Paris (high school equivalent), then studied theatre with her future husband, Francis Huster at the Cours Florent.

Personal life
In March, 2009, she was reported to be dating American actor and director John Malkovich

Filmography

Film
1989: Monsieur Hire (by Patrice Leconte) - L'adolescente au bowling
1992: L'Inconnu dans la maison (by Georges Lautner) - Isabelle Loursat
1993: Tout ça... pour ça ! (by Claude Lelouch) - Brésilienne
1997: Une femme très très amoureuse (by Ariel Zeitoun) - Florence
2004: Le Genre humain (by Claude Lelouch) - La vendeuse de la joaillerie
2005: Le courage d'aimer (by Claude Lelouch) - La vendeuse de la bijouterie
2008: Deux jours à tuer (by Jean Becker) - Virginie - l'aguicheuse
2008: A Man and His Dog (by Francis Huster) - Femme parc
2013: Turf (by Fabien Onteniente) - La femme élégante
2013: Le grand méchant loup (by Nicolas Charlet) - Eléonore de Saint-André
2015: Qui c'est les plus forts? (by Charlotte de Turckheim) - La mère
2016: Camping 3 (by Fabien Onteniente) - Clotilde

Television
1994: Le raisin d'or (TV Movie, by Joël Séria) - Juliet Sabatou
1995: Terre indigo (by Jean Sagols) - Constance
1998: La Dame aux camélias (TV Movie, by Jean-Claude Brialy) - Marguerite Gautier
2000: L'Amour sur le fil (TV Movie, by Michaela Watteaux) - Sandrine
2000: Phobie (by Arnaud Selignac)
2002: Si j'étais lui (TV Movie, by Philippe Triboit) - Ariane
2003: La tranchée des espoirs (TV Movie, by Jean-Louis Lorenzi) - Sylvaine Morillon
2004: Quand la mer se retire (TV Movie, by Laurent Heynemann) - Valérie
2004: Le Miroir de l'eau (by Edwin Baily) - Gabrielle Castella
2005: Le Bal des célibataires (TV Movie, by Jean-Louis Lorenzi) - Sylvaine
2007: Chat bleu, chat noir (by Jean-Louis Lorenzi) - Sylvaine
2007: Où es-tu ? (by Miguel Courtois) - Marie
2007: Épuration (TV Movie, by Jean-Louis Lorenzi) - Sylvaine
2007: Une suite pour deux (by Didier Albert) - Julie
2008: Où es-tu ? (by Miguel Courtois) - Marie
2009: La maitresse du président (by Jean-Pierre Sinapi) - Marguerite
2015: Meurtres en Bourgogne (by Jérôme Navarro) - Mylène Deville

References

External links
 
 http://glamaset.uol.com.br/galerias/index.php?cat=1550

1965 births
Living people
Actresses from São Paulo
Brazilian people of Italian descent
Brazilian emigrants to France
Brazilian expatriates in France
Actresses from Paris
French people of Brazilian descent
French people of Italian descent
French female models
French film actresses
French television actresses
French stage actresses
Cours Florent alumni
20th-century French actresses
21st-century French actresses